Food Network was a New Zealand pay television channel focused entirely on programming relating to food. It was based in Auckland and was New Zealand's only channel dedicated to the food, wine and restaurant society. The network never originated its own domestic content.

The channel was launched on Sky on 1 November 2005 as Food TV by The Living Channel New Zealand Limited.

The Living Channel New Zealand Limited, which owned Food TV as well as sister channel Living was acquired by Discovery, Inc. on July 2, 2014.

On 1 December 2018, Food TV was rebranded as a localised version of the American Food Network.

On 3 February 2021, Sky announced that Food Network would close in New Zealand and a selection of Food Network shows would be moved to its sister channel, Living. On 1 March 2021 the channel's schedule was replaced with a localised version of Investigation Discovery.

References
Sky TV Press release. 25 August 2005. Retrieved 23 Feb 2006.

External links

Television channels in New Zealand
English-language television stations in New Zealand
New Zealand
Television channels and stations established in 2005
Television channels and stations disestablished in 2021
2005 establishments in New Zealand
2021 disestablishments in New Zealand
Defunct television channels in New Zealand